The Club is a 2015 Chilean drama film directed, co-produced and co-written by Pablo Larraín. It was screened in the main competition of the 65th Berlin International Film Festival where it won the Jury Grand Prix. It was selected as the Chilean entry for the Best Foreign Language Film at the 88th Academy Awards but it was not nominated.

Plot
Four retired Catholic priests share a secluded house on the outskirts of a small Chilean beach town under the supervision of a vigilant female caretaker who used to be a nun. The four men are there to discreetly purge their alleged sins and crimes, including child abuse, baby-snatching for adoptions, and whistleblowing. They are not permitted to mingle with the townsfolk and are only allowed out during early morning and late night. Their only hobby is breeding a racing dog and entering competitions. Their routine changes when a new priest arrives, and a victim of his child abuse follows him, leading the priest to commit suicide. Subsequently, a new spiritual director arrives, disrupting their lives and routine.

Cast

Reception
The film was well received, with The Guardian giving it five stars and said Pablo Larraín was "at his most masterful".  Variety called it "an original and brilliantly acted chamber drama in which Larrain’s fiercely political voice comes through as loud and clear as ever".

On Rotten Tomatoes, the film has an 88% score based on 89 reviews, with an average rating of 7.86/10. The site's consensus states: "The Club finds director Pablo Larraín continuing to pose difficult questions while exploring weighty themes -- and getting the most out of a talented cast." Metacritic reports a 73 out of 100 score based on 26 reviews, indicating "generally favorable reviews".

Awards

See also
 Cinema of Chile
 List of submissions to the 88th Academy Awards for Best Foreign Language Film
 List of Chilean submissions for the Academy Award for Best Foreign Language Film

References

External links
 
 
 
 

2015 films
2015 drama films
2010s Spanish-language films
Chilean drama films
Films about Catholic priests
Films about child abuse
Films directed by Pablo Larraín
Films set in Chile
Films shot in Chile
Silver Bear Grand Jury Prize winners
2010s Chilean films